Islam is the second-largest religion in Mozambique behind Christianity. Estimates about adherents of Islam in Mozambique vary between 17% and 19% of the total population. According to local Muslim sources, 25 to 30% of Mozambicans are Muslim. The faith was introduced by merchants visiting the Swahili coast, as the region was part of a Muslim economic network that spanned the Indian Ocean. This later led to the formation of several officially Muslim political entities in the region. The vast majority of Mozambican Muslims are Sunni Muslims. The Muslims consist primarily of indigenous Mozambicans, citizens of South Asian (Indian and Pakistani) descent, and a very small number of North African and Middle Eastern immigrants.

Pre-colonial history

Mozambique has long historic ties with the Muslim world. Initially by way of Sufi merchants, mostly from Yemen, and centuries after through a more organized system of coastal trading cities, more heavily influenced by the Ibadi Muslims from Oman along the shores of Eastern Africa.

The arrival of the Arab trade in Mozambique dates to the fourth Hijri century when Muslims established small emirates on the coast of East Africa. Links between Islam and the chiefly clans in Mozambique have existed since the eleventh century, when Islam made inroads into the northern Mozambican coast and became associated with the Shirazi ruling elites.

Since the founding of the Kilwa Sultanate in the 10th AD century by Ali ibn al-Hassan Shirazi, Islam had become a major religion in the region. The former port city of Sofala, which became famous for its trade in ivory, timber, slaves, gold (by way of Great Zimbabwe) and iron with the Islamic Middle East and India, was one of the most important trading centres on the Mozambique coast. Sofala and much of the rest of coastal Mozambique was part of the Kilwa Sultanate from Arab arrival (believed to be the 12th century) until the Portuguese conquest in 1505. During the subsequent period of the Omani Al Bu Said dynasty, Muslim merchants expanded their trading zones south along the coast.

Colonial history

Islam faced challenges in Mozambique during the colonial era. Since the Estado Novo period (1926–1974), Roman Catholicism has become the dominant religion following a formal alliance (Concordat) between the Church and the government. Only with the start of the War of Liberation did the state lower its opposition to Islam and try to accommodate the religion, in order to avoid an alliance between Muslims and the dissident liberation movement.

Modern Mozambique

Since the end of the socialist period (1989 onwards), Muslims have been able to proselytise freely and build new mosques. Muslims have also made their way into the parliament. Several South African, Kuwaiti and other Muslim agencies are active in Mozambique, with one important one being the African Muslim Agency. An Islamic University has been set up in Nampula, with a branch in Inhambane. Mozambique is also an active member of the Organisation of Islamic Cooperation (OIC).

Rather than relying on the culturally loaded notions of a "chief" of régulo, the FRELIMO government has preferred to use the term "traditional authorities" to indicate a group of chiefs and their entourage of subordinate chiefs and healers. Realizing the social importance of this group, FRELIMO gradually reinstated "traditional authority."

While the Muslim leadership in northern Mozambique seems to have recovered the "traditional" side of their authority and power with legal reforms, they are still largely associated with chieftainship and African culture rather than Islam. Because of this they are barely able to access benefits or gain socio-political influence through Islamic platforms or organizations. This situation has been the source of their continual frustration and resistance to the alleged racial and cultural discrimination perpetrated by FRELIMO allied with southern Wahhabis, Afro-Indians, and Indians.

Whereas Sudan, for instance, had made sharia the law of the land, Mozambique has made attempts to recognize both traditional and religious marriages.

Impact 
From the arrival of Islam in the region, literacy rates among the locals via utilizing the Arabic script had risen by the late 19th century. Use of the script was often used for secular affairs like recording business transactions, writing local histories or creating literature. The script was used by diverse groups including the Swahili, non-Swahili Africans, non-Muslims, and women.

Prominent Mozambican Muslims
Amade Camal, MP from Nampula Province
Abel Xavier, Portugal international footballer
José Ibraimo Abudo, politician and former Minister of Justice
Nazira Abdula, politician and pediatrist

See also

Religion in Mozambique
Insurgency in Cabo Delgado

References

Further reading

 Alpers, Edwards, “ Islam in the Service of Colonialism ? Portuguese Strategy During the Armed Liberation Struggle in Mozambique ”, Lusotopie 1999 (Paris, Karthala), 1999, pp. 165–184.
Bonate, Liazzat J. K., “Divergent Patterns of Islamic Education in Northern Mozambique: Qur’anic Schools of Angoche.” In Robert Launay, ed., Islamic Education in Africa: Writing Boards and Blackboards. Bloomington and Indianapolis: Indiana University Press, 2016, 95-118.
Bonate, Liazzat J. K.,   “Islam and Literacy in Northern Mozambique: Historical Records on the Secular Uses of the Arabic Script.” Islamic Africa, Vol. 7, 2016, 60-80.
Bonate, Liazzat J. K.  “The Advent and Schisms of Sufi Orders in Mozambique, 1896–1964”.  Islam and Christian–Muslim Relations, Vol. 26, No. 4, 2015,  483-501.
Bonate, Liazzat J. K., “Muslim Memories of the Liberation War in Cabo Delgado.” Kronos: Southern African Histories, Vol. 39, November 2013, 230-256.
Bonate, Liazzat J. K.  “Muslims of Northern Mozambique and the Liberation Movements”. Social Dynamics, Vol. 35, No 2, September, 2009, 280-294. 
Bonate, Liazzat J. K., “L’Agence des musulmans d’Afrique. Les transformations de l’islam à Pemba au Mozambique”. Afrique Contemporaine, No. 231, 2009, 63-80.
Bonate, Liazzat J. K., “Muslim Religious Leadership in Post-Colonial Mozambique.” South African Historical Journal, No 60 (4), 2008, 637-654.
Bonate, Liazzat J. K., “Governance of Islam in Colonial Mozambique.” In V. Bader, A. Moors and M. Maussen, eds., Colonial and Post-Colonial Governance of Islam. Amsterdam University Press, 2011, 29-48.
Bonate, Liazzat J. K., “Between Da’wa and Development: Three Transnational Islamic Nongovernmental Organizations in Mozambique, 1980–2010”. Newsletter of the Africa Research Initiative, Second Edition –March 2015, Centre for Strategic Intelligence Research, National Intelligence University, Washington DC, pp. 7–11. 
Bonate, Liazzat J. K. “Traditions and Traditions: Islam and Chiefship in Northern Mozambique, ca. 1850-1974.” (PhD Dissertation, University of Cape Town, 2007)
Bonate, Liazzat J. K. « Matriliny, Islam and Gender in Northern Mozambique », Journal of Religion in Africa, vol.36, no.2, pp. 2006, pp. 139–166
Bonate, Liazzat J. K. "Dispute over Islamic funeral rites in Mozambique. A Demolidora dos Prazeres by Shaykh Aminuddin Mohamad », LFM. Social sciences & missions , no.17, Dec.2005, pp. 41–59
 Carvalho, Á. de, “ Notas para a história das confrarias islâmica na Ilha de Moçambique ”, Arquivo (Maputo) (4), octobre : 59-66.
 João, B. B., Abdul Kamal e a história de Chiúre nos séculos XIX-XX, Maputo, Arquivos históricos de Moçambique, (Coll. Estudos, n° 17), 2000
 Macagno, Lorenzo, Outros muçulmanos : Islão e narrativas coloniais, Lisbon (Portugal) : Imprensa de Ciências Sociais, 2006
 Monteiro, O., “ Sobre a actuação da corrente "wahhabitta" no Islão moçambicano : algumas notas relativas ao período 1964-1974 ”, Africana (Porto) (12), 1993, pp. 85-107.
 Monteiro, O., O Islão, o poder e a guerra (Moçambique 1964-1974), Porto, Universidade Portucalense, 1993.
 Morier-Genoud, Eric, « L’islam au Mozambique après l’indépendance. Histoire d’une montée en puissance », L’Afrique Politique 2002, Paris: Karthala, 2002, pp. 123–146
 Morier-Genoud, Eric, « The 1996 ‘Muslim holiday’ affair. Religious competition and state mediation in contemporary Mozambique », Journal of Southern African Studies, Oxford, vol.26, n°3, Sept. 2000, pp.409–427.
 Morier-Genoud, Eric “A Prospect of Secularization? Muslims and Political Power in Mozambique Today”, Journal for Islamic Studies (Cape Town), no. 27, 2007, pp. 233–266
 Morier-Genoud, Eric “Demain la sécularisation? Les musulmans et le pouvoir au Mozambique aujourd’hui”, in R. Otayek & B. Soares (ed.), Etat et société en Afrique. De l'islamisme à l'islam mondain? (Paris: Karthala, 2009), pp. 353–383